Michael Powell represented Dedham, Massachusetts in the Great and General Court in 1641 and 1648. His daughter, Sarah, married Timothy Dwight. He was also town clerk for a total of four years, having first been elected in 1643. He was a selectman for four years, beginning in 1641. He was the first tavern owner in Dedham.

Powell later moved to Boston and taught, without being ordained, at Second Church, Boston prior to Increase Mather.

References

Works cited

Dedham, Massachusetts selectmen
Members of the colonial Massachusetts General Court from Dedham
Year of birth missing
Year of death missing
Dedham Town Clerks
Signers of the Dedham Covenant